Seninghem is a commune in the Pas-de-Calais department in the Hauts-de-France region of France.

Geography
Seninghem is located approximately 10 miles (16 km) west of Saint-Omer, on the D204 road.

Population

Places of interest
 The seventeenth-century church of St Martin.
 The seventeenth-century chapel of Notre Dame.
 The ‘Arcs de Triomphe’ at the cemetery entrances.

See also
Communes of the Pas-de-Calais department

References

External links

 Seninghem on the Quid website 

Communes of Pas-de-Calais